Beata Smarzynska Javorcik is a Polish economist who is currently the Chief Economist at the European Bank for Reconstruction and Development (EBRD). She is the first woman to hold this position. She is also the first woman to hold a statutory professorship in economics at the University of Oxford. She is a former senior economist of the Development Economics Research Group at the World Bank, where she previously served as a Country Economist for Azerbaijan, Europe, and the Central Asia Region and was involved in research activities regarding lending operations and policy advice. She is also a program director of the International Trade and Regional Economics Programme at the Centre for Economic Policy Research in London. Her other affiliations include the Royal Economic Society in London, CESifo in Munich, International Growth Centre in London, and the Centre for Research on Globalization and Economic Policy at the University of Nottingham.

Javorcik holds an editorial position at the World Bank Economic Review, and formerly held editorial positions at Economic Policy, Journal of International Economics, Oxford Bulletin of Economics and Statistics, and Oxford Economic Papers. Her research interests are in the fields of international trade, foreign direct investment, investment promotion, and tax evasion. Her research also explores how developing countries and transition economies are able to harness globalization to stimulate their economic growth.

Early life and education 
In May 1994, Javorcik graduated from the University of Rochester with Bachelor of Arts in Economics. She earned a Ph.D. in Economics from Yale University, where she studied International Trade and Development Economics.

Career 
Prior to obtaining her Ph.D, Javorcik was hired as a research assistant at the Chief Economist Office of the European Bank (EBRD) in London.

After earning her PhD, in 1999 Javorcik started working at the World Bank in Washington D.C., where she was initially a young professional of the Development Economics Research Group, and after one year she served a position as a country economist for Azerbaijan, Europe, and Central Asia Region. In 2001, she was an economist at the Development of Economics Research Group of the World Bank and finally in 2004 she became a senior economist at the Development of Economics Research Group of the World Bank.

Once she left from her position at the World Bank in 2007, Javorcik became involved in teaching at the University of Oxford, where she started as a fellow and tutor in Economics at Christ Church, Oxford, and at the same time served as a reader in economics for three years (2007–2010) at the University of Oxford. In 2010, she was a professor of International Economics. In 2014, Javorcik was the first woman to hold position of a Statutory Professorship of Economics at the University of Oxford. In the same year, she started as a professorial fellow at All Souls College Oxford, in which position she is currently on leave.

In February 2019, the EBRD appointed Javorcik as its new chief economist; she is the first woman who has ever held this position.

In 2020, Javorcik was appointed by the World Health Organization’s Regional Office for Europe to serve as a member of the Pan-European Commission on Health and Sustainable Development, chaired by Mario Monti.

Publications 
Javorcik's works regarding determinants and consequences of inflow of Foreign Direct Investment have been reprinted and featured in several publications, such as Multinational Enterprise and Host Economies by K. Meyer (2008),  Globalization and Productivity by D. Greenaway, H. Gorg and R. Kneller (2008), Financial Times "Investors See Corruption as Barriers" by Alan Beattie (2000).

Selected main publications 

Javorcik, Beata, et al. "Good for the Environment, Good for Business: Foreign Acquisitions and Energy Intensity." Journal of International Economics, November 2019.
 Javorcik, Beata, and Matej Bajgar. "Climbing the Rungs of the Quality Ladder: FDI and Domestic Exporters in Romania." Economic Journal (forthcoming). 
 Javorcik, Beata, et al. "Working across Time Zones: Exporters and the Gender Wage Gap", Journal of International Economics, 2018. 
 Javorcik, Beata, and Naotaka Sawada. "The ISO 9000 Certification: Little Pain, Big Gain?", European Economic Review, 2018.
 Javorcik, Beata, and Banu Demir.  "Don’t Throw in the Towel, Throw in Trade Credit", Journal of International Economics, 2018.
 Javorcik, Beata, et al. "New and Improved: Does FDI Boost Production Complexity in Host Countries?", Economic Journal, 2018. 
 Javorcik, Beata, and Steven Peolhekke. "Former Foreign Affiliates: Cast Out and Outperformed?", Journal of the European Economic Association, 15(3), Lead article, January 2017.
 Javorcik, Beata, and Gaia Narciso. "WTO Accession and Tariff Evasion", Journal of Development Economics, Volume125, March 2017, p.59-71. 
 Javorcik, Beata, et al. "Services Reform and Manufacturing Performance: Evidence from India", Economic Journal, 126(590), 2016.
 Javorcik, Beata, et al. "Supplier Responses to Walmart’s Invasion of Mexico", Journal of International Economics, Lead article, 95(1), 2015.
 Javorcik, Beata, et al. “Multi-Product Firms at Home and Away: Cost- versus Quality-based Competence”, Journal of International Economics, 95(2), 2015. 
Javorcik, Beata, and Yue Li. “Do the Biggest Aisles Serve a Brighter Future? Global Retail Chains and Their Implications for Romania”, Journal of International Economics, 2013. 
Javorcik, Beata, and Torfinn Harding. “FDI and Export Upgrading”, Review of Economics and Statistics, 94(4), 2012.
Javorcik, Beata, and Torfinn Harding. “Roll out the Red Carpet and They Will Come: Investment Promotion and FDI Inflows” Economic Journal, 121(557), 2011.
 Javorcik, Beata, et al. “Does Services Liberalization Benefit Manufacturing Firms? Evidence from the Czech Republic”, Journal of International Economics, 85(1), September 2011, p.136-146.
 Javorcik, Beata, et al. “Migrant Networks and Foreign Direct Investment”, Journal of Development Economics, 94(2), March 2011, p.231-241.
 Javorcik, Beata, and Leonardi Iacovone. “Multi-product Exporters: Product Churning, Uncertainty and Export Discoveries”, Economic Journal, Volume120, May 2010, p. 481 - 499.
 Javorcik, Beata, and J. Arnold. “Gifted Kids or Pushy Parents? Foreign Direct Investment and Plant Productivity in Indonesia”, Journal of International Economics, 79(1), 2009.
Javorcik, Beata, and Shang-Jin Wei. “Corruption and Cross-border Investment in Emerging Markets: Firm-Level Evidence”, Journal of International Money and Finance, 28(4), 2009, p.605 - 624.
 Javorcik, Beata, and Gaia Narciso. “Differentiated Products and Evasion of Import Tariffs”, Journal of International Economics, 76(2), 2008.
 Javorcik, Beata, and Mary Amiti. “Trade Costs and Location of Foreign Firms in China”, Journal of Development Economics, 85(1-2), 2008, p.129 - 149.
 Javorcik, Beata, and Mariana Spatareanu. “To Share or Not to Share: Does Local Participation Matter for Spillovers from FDI?”, Journal of Development Economics, 85(1-2), 2008.
 Javorcik, Beata. “Does Foreign Direct Investment Increase the Productivity of Domestic Firms? In Search of Spillovers through Backward Linkages,” American Economic Review, 94(3), 2004. 
 Javorcik, Beata. “The Composition of Foreign Direct Investment and Protection of Intellectual Property Rights in Transition Economies,” European Economic Review, 48(1), 2004.
Javorcik, Beata, and Shang-Jin Wei. “Pollution, Corruption and the Location of Foreign Direct Investment: Dirty Secret or Popular Myth?”, Contributions to Economic Analysis & Policy, 3(2), 2004.

Affiliations and advisory roles 

 Editorial Board Member, The World Bank Economic Review
 External Research Fellow, Centre for Research on Globalization and Economic Policy, University of Nottingham
 Executive Committee and Council Member, Royal Economic Society, London
 Member, International Trade program, International Growth Centre, London
 Program Director, International Trade and Regional Economics Programme, Centre for Economic Policy Research, London
 Research Network Fellow, CESifo, Munich

Previous positions 

 2003–2015: Research affiliate, Centre for Economic Policy Research, London
 2007–2010: Editorial board member, Oxford Economics Papers
 2007–2017: Co-editor, Oxford Bulletin of Economics and Statistics
 2016–2019: associate editor, Journal of International Economics
 2017–2019: managing editor, Economic Journal

Advisory roles 

 2009: Economics Advisory group for the Foresight Project, the Department of Business, Innovation, and Skills (BIS)
 2015–2016: Besley Commission, European Bank for Reconstruction and Development (EBRD)
 2018–2019: Evaluation Steering Group, CDC Group (DFID)
 2016–present: Strategic advisory board, Kiel Centre for Globalization
 2016–present: Strategic advisory board, School of Economics at the University of Nottingham

Grants and honors

References 

Living people
Year of birth missing (living people)
Yale University alumni
University of Rochester alumni
Statutory Professors of the University of Oxford
Polish women academics
Polish women economists
21st-century Polish women writers